The Franco-Dahomean Wars were a series of military conflicts including:

 First Franco-Dahomean War, that pitted the Kingdom of Dahomey against the Third French Republic and its vassal kingdom of Porto-Novo
 Second Franco-Dahomean War, between Dahomey and France